The black pipe snake (Cylindrophis melanotus) is a species of snake in the family Cylindrophiidae endemic to Indonesia.

References

Cylindrophiidae
Reptiles described in 1828